Duncan Campbell (born 1944) is a British journalist and author who has worked particularly on crime issues. He was a senior reporter/correspondent for The Guardian from 1987 until 2010. He is also the author of several books.

Background and personal life
Campbell was educated at the Edinburgh Academy and at Glenalmond College, Perth and Kinross, Scotland. (Glenalmond Register 1950–1985)

Campbell is married to the British actress Julie Christie; they have lived together since 1979, but the date they married is not clear. In January 2008, several news outlets reported that the couple had quietly married in India in November 2007, which Christie called "nonsense", adding: "I have been married for a few years. Don't believe what you read in the papers."

Journalist
Campbell was a copywriter for advertising agency Ogilvy & Mather before he quit in 1971, aged 26, to visit India, and pursue an ambition to become a journalist. Decades later, he turned the experience of the trip into his first novel, The Paradise Trail.

Prior to joining The Guardian, Campbell worked for the London Daily News and City Limits (both defunct), Time Out and LBC Radio. He has also worked on BBC Radio Five Live's Crime Desk programme.

In June 2009, it was announced by The Guardian that Campbell would take voluntary redundancy and he now works as a freelance writer, including for The Guardian.

Campbell is a former chair of the Crime Reporters' Association, for four years in the 1990s, and winner of the Bar Council Legal Reporting Award for Newspaper Journalist of the Year in 1992.

Author

Fiction
Campbell is the author of two novels, the first of which, The Paradise Trail, was published in 2008. Set largely in India in 1971, it is partly a murder mystery and partly an affectionate depiction of life on the "hippie trail": the cheap hotels and eating places, the music, the drug-fuelled conversations. According to the reviewer for the Socialist Review: "One impressive aspect of this book is the almost seamless blending of quite mundane events such as cricket matches with serious issues like imperialism, British and Indian politics, and death. Campbell makes important points through his characters without rendering them ridiculous – no mean feat considering the main characters are permanently stoned hippies and a frustrated hotelier. One of the reviews on the back of the book described it as 'a great beach read', but I'd go further than that – it's a great read whether you're on a beach or not." According to The Independent: "Duncan Campbell skilfully traces how the paradise trail upon which these naive hopefuls stumble leads painfully back to the very selves they had hoped to flee."

Campbell's second novel was If It Bleeds (2009), which one reviewer summed up by saying: "What you've got here is a cracking good yarn, told with verve and humour. Can we have a follow-up?"

Non-fiction
Campbell has written several nonfiction books, including a history of British crime from the 1930s to the 1990s (The Underworld, 1994 — based on the BBC television series) and That Was Business, This Is Personal (1990 — a series of interviews with criminals and those who pursue them). A Stranger and Afraid (1997) covers the story of Caroline Beale. Campbell's 2016 book We'll All Be Murdered In Our Beds draws on his many years as a crime correspondent; about which the Evening Standard wrote: "A strong sense of nostalgia runs throughout this zany catalogue of atrocity and achievement", while The Guardian reviewer called the book "by turns amusing, engaging, horrifying and, yes, thoughtful. It is not merely a catalogue of the goriest and most notorious crimes, but a fascinating description of the often corrupt relationship between Fleet Street's finest and the police." Cambell's latest (2019) book, The Underworld: The inside story of Britain’s professional and organised crime, was a The Sunday Times Bestseller.

Bibliography
 Billy Connolly: The Authorized Version (Pan Books, 1976) - biography of Billy Connolly, 
 War Plan UK: The Truth about Civil Defence in the UK (Burnett Books, 1982) 
 That Was Business, This Is Personal: The Changing Face of Professional Crime (Secker & Warburg, 1990), 
 The Underworld (BBC Books, 1994), ; revised edition (Penguin Books, 1996) 
 A Stranger and Afraid: The story of Caroline Beale (Macmillan, 1997), 
 The Paradise Trail (The Headline Review, 2008), paperback 
 If It Bleeds (Headline Publishing Group, 2009), 
 We'll All Be Murdered In Our Beds: The Shocking History of Crime Reporting in Britain (Elliott & Thompson, 2016), 
 The Underworld: The inside story of Britain’s professional and organised crime (Ebury, National Geographic Books, Amazon, 2019) ,

References

External links
Journalisted - Articles by Duncan Campbell
Duncan Campbell at The Guardian
 Dominic Ponsford, "Duncan Campbell on crime reporting, death threats, Rusbridger and the police - Journalism Matters podcast", Press Gazette, 18 May 2016.

1944 births
Living people
British male journalists
The Guardian journalists
Place of birth missing (living people)
People educated at Glenalmond College
People educated at Edinburgh Academy
Male non-fiction writers
British male novelists